The 2002–03 season was the 100th in the history of Boavista F.C. and their 35th consecutive season in the top flight. The club participated in the Primeira Liga, the Taça de Portugal, the UEFA Champions League, and the UEFA Cup.

Players

Transfers

Pre-season and friendlies

Competitions

Overall record

Primeira Liga

League table

Results summary

Results by round

Matches

Taça de Portugal

UEFA Champions League

Third qualifying round

Second qualifying round

UEFA Cup

First round

Second round

Third round

Fourth round

Quarter-finals

Semi-finals

Statistics

Appearances and goals

|-
! colspan=14 style=background:#dcdcdc; text-align:center| Goalkeepers

|-
! colspan=14 style=background:#dcdcdc; text-align:center| Defenders

|-
! colspan=14 style=background:#dcdcdc; text-align:center| Midfielders

|-
! colspan=14 style=background:#dcdcdc; text-align:center| Forwards

|-
! colspan=14 style=background:#dcdcdc; text-align:center| Players transferred out during the season

References 

Boavista F.C. seasons
Boavista